Progress M1-2 was a Progress spacecraft which was launched by Russia in 2000 to resupply the Mir space station. It was a Progress-M1 11F615A55 spacecraft, with the serial number 252.

Progress M1-2 was launched by a Soyuz-U carrier rocket from Site 1/5 at the Baikonur Cosmodrome. Launch occurred at 20:08:02 GMT on 25 April 2000. The spacecraft docked with the Aft port on the Kvant-1 module of Mir at 21:28:47 GMT on 27 April. It remained docked for 171 days before undocking at 18:06 GMT on 15 October to make way for Progress M-43. It was deorbited later the same day. The spacecraft burned up in the atmosphere over the Pacific Ocean at around 23:29 GMT.

Progress M1-2 carried supplies to Mir, including food, water and oxygen for the crew and equipment for conducting scientific research. Progress M1-2 was the first privately funded resupply mission to a space station. It was funded by RKK Energia as part of the MirCorp programme. It was the last Progress spacecraft to be docked to Mir whilst a crew was present aboard the station.

See also

2000 in spaceflight
List of Progress flights
List of uncrewed spaceflights to Mir

References

Spacecraft launched in 2000
Mir
Progress (spacecraft) missions
Space tourism